Madeline Johnston is an American singer-songwriter, multi-instrumentalist, and audio engineer. She is best known for her work under the moniker Midwife, and has also released music as Mariposa and Sister Grotto. Her debut album, as Mariposa, was titled Holy Ghost and released in 2013. As Sister Grotto, Johnston released You Don't Have to Be a House to Be Haunted, Blindside, and Song For An Unborn Sun (alongside Devin Shaffer as Yarrow) in 2016. These were followed a year later by Like Author, Like Daughter as Midwife, in collaboration with Tucker Theodore. Her next two albums as Midwife were Forever (2020) and Luminol (2021).

Johnston describes her music as "heaven metal".

References

Shoegaze musicians
Slowcore musicians
Dream pop musicians
Ambient musicians
American indie pop musicians
Year of birth missing (living people)
Living people